The 1904 United States presidential election in Arkansas took place on November 8, 1904. All contemporary 45 states were part of the 1904 United States presidential election. Voters chose nine electors to the Electoral College, which selected the president and vice president.

Arkansas was won by the Democratic nominees, Chief Judge Alton B. Parker of New York and his running mate Henry G. Davis of West Virginia.

Results

Results by county

See also
 United States presidential elections in Arkansas

Notes

References

Arkansas
1904
1904 Arkansas elections